Thiago Monteiro was the defending champion and successfully defended his title, defeating Marco Cecchinato 7–6(7–3), 6–7(6–8), 7–5 in the final.

Seeds
All seeds receive a bye into the second round.

Draw

Finals

Top half

Section 1

Section 2

Bottom half

Section 3

Section 4

References

External links
Main draw
Qualifying draw

2020 Singles
2020 ATP Challenger Tour